Mindaugas Norbutas (born 24 August 1976, in Vaiguva) is a retired Lithuanian middle-distance runner, who specialized in the 800 metres. He represented his nation Lithuania at the 2004 Summer Olympics, and also recorded a national record and a personal best of 1:46.64 in the men's 800 metres upon placing sixth at the 2003 EWE Athletics Cup in Cuxhaven, Germany. Norbutas has also trained throughout his athletic career for Tutuvenai Sport Club in his native Kelmė, under his personal coach Povilas Sabaitis.

Norbutas qualified for the men's 800 metres at the 2004 Summer Olympics in Athens, by registering a B-standard entry time of 1:46.64 from the EWE Athletics Cup in Cuxhaven. He threw down a seasonal best of 1:47.38 in heat two, but faded only to sixth and did not advance further into the semifinals, trailing behind the leader Joseph Mutua of Kenya by almost two seconds.

References

External links

1976 births
Living people
Lithuanian male middle-distance runners
Olympic athletes of Lithuania
Athletes (track and field) at the 2004 Summer Olympics
People from Kelmė